The Grace Methodist Episcopal Church in Winfield, Kansas is a historic church which was built in 1917.  It has been known as Grace United Methodist Church since the Methodist Episcopal Church and the Evangelical United Brethren Church merged in 1968. It is located at 320 College Street in Winfield.  It was added to the National Register of Historic Places in 2005.

It is a large three-story church designed by Ernest Olaf Brostrom in Collegiate Gothic style. A two-story education wing was added in 1959.

References

Methodist churches in Kansas
Churches on the National Register of Historic Places in Kansas
Collegiate Gothic architecture in Kansas
Churches completed in 1917
Buildings and structures in Cowley County, Kansas
National Register of Historic Places in Cowley County, Kansas